San José Island could refer to:

 San José Island (Colombia), a river island in the Rio Negro
 San José Island (Texas), United States
 Isla San José (Baja California Sur), Mexico
 Isla San José (Panama), Pearl Islands, Panama
 Weddell Island, Falkland Islands (claimed as "Isla San José" by Argentina)

See also
 Saint Joseph Island (disambiguation)